Yekaterina Nikolayevna Tudegesheva (also spelled Ekaterina; born 30 October 1987 in Rostov-on-Don) is a Russian professional snowboarder. She is an ethnic Shor.

World Cup results
All results are sourced from the International Ski Federation (FIS).

Season titles
 3 titles – (1 speed overall, 1 parallel overall, 1 parallel slalom)

Season standings

a.  Includes parallel slalom, parallel giant slalom and snowboard cross events. Athlete's best six results are counted for the overall classification.
b.  Includes all World Cup snowboarding events. Athlete's best six results are counted for the overall classification.

Race Podiums
 12 wins – (5 , 7 )
 27 podiums – (10 , 17 )

References

External links
 
 
 
 

1987 births
Living people
Sportspeople from Rostov-on-Don
Russian female snowboarders
Olympic snowboarders of Russia
Snowboarders at the 2006 Winter Olympics
Snowboarders at the 2010 Winter Olympics
Snowboarders at the 2014 Winter Olympics
Snowboarders at the 2018 Winter Olympics